is a 1972 Japanese film directed by Kōichi Saitō. Also known as a Journey Into Solitude in English. The story is about a 16-year-old girl who is unsatisfied with her life and leaves her home in search of something else.

Cast
 Kumiko Akiyoshi
 Etsushi Takahashi as Daizo Kimura

References

External links

1972 films
Films directed by Kōichi Saitō
Japanese drama films
1970s Japanese films